Athrips sibirica is a moth of the family Gelechiidae. It is found in Russia (Altai), Mongolia and China (Hebei). The habitat consists of steppes and forest-steppes in the mountains.

The wingspan is 14–16 mm. The forewings are covered with dark grey, white-tipped scales. There is an indistinct spot at one-third, two dark spots at about one-half and two very small spots at three-fourths. The hindwings are grey. Adults are on wing June to July.

References

Moths described in 2005
Athrips
Moths of Asia